The 1995 Prague Open was a women's tennis tournament played on outdoor clay courts at the I. Czech Lawn Tennis Club in Prague in the Czech Republic that was part of Tier IV of the 1995 WTA Tour. The tournament was held from 8 May through 14 May 1995. First-seeded Julie Halard won the singles title.

Finals

Singles

 Julie Halard defeated  Ludmila Richterová 6–4, 6–4
 It was Halard's only singles title of the year and the 4th of her career.

Doubles

 Linda Harvey-Wild /  Chanda Rubin defeated  Maria Lindström /  Maria Strandlund 6–7, 6–3, 6–2
 It was Harvey-Wild's 1st title of the year and the 5th of her career. It was Rubin's only title of the year and the 3rd of her career.

References

External links
 WTA tournament draws

Prague Open
Prague Open
1995 in Czech tennis